Üçkuyu can refer to:

 Üçkuyu, Bekilli
 Üçkuyu, Kulp
 Üçkuyu, Sultandağı